Baron Lindsay of Birker, of Low Ground in the County of Cumberland, is a title in the Peerage of the United Kingdom. It was created on 13 November 1945 for the Scottish academic and educationalist, Sandie Lindsay. His eldest son, the second Baron, was Professor of Far Eastern Studies at the American University in Washington, D.C. The second Baron's wife, Hsiao Li, was the first Chinese-born peeress.  the title is held by the second Baron's only son, the third Baron, who succeeded in 1994. He is an Australian citizen and diplomat. Lord Lindsay has notably served as Deputy Australian High Commissioner to Pakistan and Kenya.

Barons Lindsay of Birker (1945)
Alexander Dunlop "Sandie" Lindsay, 1st Baron Lindsay of Birker (1879–1952)
Michael Francis Morris Lindsay, 2nd Baron Lindsay of Birker (1909–1994)
James Francis Lindsay, 3rd Baron Lindsay of Birker (b. 1945)

The heir presumptive is the present holder's first cousin once removed Simon Alexander Lindsay (b. 1963). He is the grandson of Major Thomas Martin Lindsay, brother of the second Baron.

References

Kidd, Charles, Williamson, David (editors). Debrett's Peerage and Baronetage (1990 edition). New York: St Martin's Press, 1990.

Baronies in the Peerage of the United Kingdom
Noble titles created in 1945
Australian expatriates in Pakistan